Christoffer Rambo (born 18 November 1989) is a Norwegian handball player for IL Runar and the Norwegian national team.

References

External links

Living people
Norwegian male handball players
1989 births
Norwegian expatriate sportspeople in France
Norwegian expatriate sportspeople in Germany
Norwegian expatriate sportspeople in Spain
People from Sandefjord
Sportspeople from Vestfold og Telemark